Justyna Kaczkowska (born 7 October 1997) is a Polish professional racing cyclist. She rode in the women's team pursuit at the 2016 UCI Track Cycling World Championships. and at the 2016 Olympic Games in Rio de Janeiro.

Career results

2016
UEC U23 European Championships
1st  Individual Pursuit
3rd  Team Pursuit (with Monika Graczewska, Łucja Pietrzak and Daria Pikulik)
GP Czech Cycling Federation
1st Points Race
1st Scratch Race
Prova Internacional de Anadia
1st Scratch Race
 3rd Points Race
2nd Team Pursuit, Grand Prix of Poland (with Monika Graczewska, Łucja Pietrzak and Daria Pikulik)
Panevežys
2nd Omnium
3rd Scratch Race
Grand Prix Galichyna
2nd 500m Time Trial
3rd Individual Pursuit
2017
1st Individual Pursuit, UCI Track Cycling World Cup – Round 1, Pruszków
2nd Scratch Race, UCI Track Cycling World Cup – Round 1, Pruszków
2nd Omnium, Grand Prix Favorit Brno
UEC European Track Championships
2nd Individual Pursuit
3rd Team Pursuit

References

External links
 

1997 births
Living people
Polish female cyclists
Polish track cyclists
Olympic cyclists of Poland
Cyclists at the 2016 Summer Olympics
Sportspeople from Silesian Voivodeship
People from Myszków County
Cyclists at the 2019 European Games
European Games medalists in cycling
European Games bronze medalists for Poland
21st-century Polish women